Carlotta may refer to:

People and fictional characters
Carlotta (name), a list of people and fictional characters with the given name
Carlotta (performer) (born 1943), Australian cabaret performer and TV personality
Mary Myers (1849–1932), American professional balloonist better known as "Carlotta, the Lady Aeronaut"

Places
Carlotta, California, United States, an unincorporated community
Villa Carlotta, a house on Lake Como, Italy
Villa Carlotta (Los Angeles County), two houses in California

Ships
 French brig Carlotta (1807), captured by the British in 1810 and redesignated HMS Carlotta
 , the French brig  Pylades, captured by the British and renamed Carlotta after the wreck of the earlier Carlotta
SS Carlotta, later name of 
TSS Carlotta (1893), British passenger vessel
, a United States Navy patrol boat in service from 1917 to 1918

Other uses
Tropical Storm Carlotta, several tropical cyclones in the Pacific Ocean
A fictional town in the 1949 film noir The Bribe
A fictional town in the 1982 comedy film Dead Men Don't Wear Plaid

See also

 Carlota (disambiguation)
Carotta (disambiguation)